Metareva albescens is a moth of the subfamily Arctiinae. It was described by Paul Dognin in 1902. It is found in Argentina.

References

 Natural History Museum Lepidoptera generic names catalog

Lithosiini
Moths described in 1902